Fábio Oliveira Valente, known as Fábio Zola (born 10 February 1992) is a Portuguese footballer who plays for Bragança as a forward.

Football career
On 4 August 2013, Fábio Zola made his professional debut with Leixões in a 2013–14 Taça da Liga match against Atlético.

References

External links

Stats and profile at LPFP 

1992 births
People from Oliveira de Azeméis
Living people
Portuguese footballers
Association football forwards
Leixões S.C. players
Liga Portugal 2 players
GD Bragança players
Sportspeople from Aveiro District